Syed Sohail Mehmood Mashadi (Urdu: سید سہیل محمود مشہدی) is the current Mayor of Hyderabad and an ex MQM parliamentarian from the Provincial Assembly of Sindh. He is Present Central Coordination Committee Member of MQM,  He also served as Zonal committee member of Sindh for the MQM.

Provincial Minister Sindh 
Sohail Mashadi was the MPA in Sindh Assembly from MQM in 1990. and was elected from PS-41 Hyderabad. He resigned from his post. He was former provincial minister in the Assembly of Sindh from the MQM.

Deputy Mayor of Hyderabad 
He is elected as Deputy Mayor of Hyderabad on August 24, 2016. He took office oath on August 30, 2016. He is elected as Mayor of Hyderabad 4 Feb 2019.

Detention and release 
He was detained by Rangers on May 15, 2016. He was released later.

See also 
 Tayyab Hussain
 Kunwar Naveed Jamil

References 

Mayors of Hyderabad, Sindh
Politicians from Hyderabad, Sindh
Living people
Muttahida Qaumi Movement politicians
Sindh MPAs 1990–1993
Muhajir people
Year of birth missing (living people)